Spokane is a city in the U.S. state of Washington.

Spokane may also refer to:

Places 
 Spokane River, a tributary of the Columbia River
 Spokane Valley, of the Spokane River
 Spokane, Louisiana
 Spokane, Missouri
 Spokane, South Dakota, ghost town
 Spokane County, Washington

Other uses 
 Spokane (film)
 Spokane (horse), winner of the 1889 Kentucky Derby
 Spokane people
 MV Spokane, a ferry operated Washington State Ferries
 Spokane Trophy, awarded by Commander United States Pacific Fleet
 , a Juneau-class light cruiser